Moratuwella South Grama Niladhari Division is a  Grama Niladhari Division of the  Moratuwa Divisional Secretariat  of Colombo District  of Western Province, Sri Lanka .  It has Grama Niladhari Division Code 553.

Moratuwella South is a surrounded by the  Koralawella Eest, Horethuduwa, Horethuduwa North, Horethuduwa Central, Koralawella North, Moratuwella North and Moratuwella West  Grama Niladhari Divisions.

Demographics

Ethnicity 

The Moratuwella South Grama Niladhari Division has  a Sinhalese majority (95.7%) . In comparison, the Moratuwa Divisional Secretariat (which contains the Moratuwella South Grama Niladhari Division) has  a Sinhalese majority (94.3%)

Religion 

The Moratuwella South Grama Niladhari Division has  a Buddhist plurality (45.3%), a significant Roman Catholic population (39.5%) and a significant Other Christian population (13.3%) . In comparison, the Moratuwa Divisional Secretariat (which contains the Moratuwella South Grama Niladhari Division) has  a Buddhist majority (68.2%) and a significant Roman Catholic population (19.8%)

References 

Grama Niladhari Divisions of Moratuwa Divisional Secretariat